Werner Thamm (24 August 1926 – 20 October 1987) was a German footballer.

Career
Thamm began his senior career with Amateuroberliga Niedersachsen club TSV Goslar (now Goslarer SC 08), before joining Eintracht Braunschweig in the first division Oberliga Nord in 1950. With 116 goals in 295 league and play-off games Thamm remains the all-time leading goalscorer for Eintracht Braunschweig, the club he spent most of his career with. After twelve years in Braunschweig, Thamm retired from top level play and returned to amateur football for one more season, playing for FT Braunschweig.

References

External links 
 

1926 births
1987 deaths
People from Weißenfels
German footballers
Association football forwards
Eintracht Braunschweig players
Footballers from Saxony-Anhalt